Bowling at the 2009 Asian Indoor Games was held in Superbowl Center, Ho Chi Minh City, Vietnam from 1 November to 7 November 2009.

Medalists

Men

Women

Medal table

Results

Men

Singles
1 November

Round 1

Knockout round

Doubles
3 November

Round 1

Knockout round

Team of 4

Round 1
5–6 November

Knockout round
7 November

Women

Singles
2 November

Round 1

Knockout round

Doubles
4 November

Round 1

Knockout round

Team of 4

Round 1
5–6 November

Knockout round
7 November

References
 Official site
 www.abf-online.org

2009
2009 Asian Indoor Games events
Asian Indoor Games